Omocestus raymondi is a species of slant-faced grasshopper in the family Acrididae. It is found in southern Europe and northern Africa.

References

Further reading

External links

 

raymondi